Central Mamberamo Regency is one of the regencies (kabupaten) in the Indonesian province of Highland Papua. It covers an area of 3,743.64 km2, and had a population of 39,537 at the 2010 Census and 50,685 at the 2020 Census. The official estimate as at mid 2021 was 51,160. The administrative centre is at Kobakma.

Administrative Districts
Mamberamo Tengah Regency comprises five districts (distrik), tabulated below with their areas and their populations at the 2010 Census and the 2020 Census, together with the official estimate for mid 2021. The table also includes the locations of the district administrative centres, the number of administrative villages (rural desa and urban kelurahan) in each district, and its postal code.

The sparsely-populated Megambilis District, with over 60% of the regency's area but just 2.3% of its 2021 population, occupies the entire northern portion of the regency.

References

External links
Statistics publications from Statistics Indonesia (BPS)

Regencies of Highland Papua